Lucien L'Allier (1909 - 1978) was a Canadian engineer who is best known for having built the Montreal Metro, the city's subway system.

Early life
Born in the suburb of Saint-Laurent, Quebec he studied with the Frères des écoles chrétiennes, Collège Sainte-Marie de Montréal and McGill University, from which he graduated with a degree in electrical engineering.

Career
In 1935, he took part in a three-year project working on the telephone networks of Bell Canada, and later worked for the Canadian Broadcasting Corporation as regional engineer until 1946. In 1946, he joined the staff of the city of Montreal, and became the city's engineering director in 1954. In 1961 the construction of the Montreal Metro began. He supervised a construction project with 5000 workers. McGill University awarded him an honorary doctorate in 1964. The same year, he was appointed Chairman of the Montreal Transit Commission, a position he held until his retirement in 1974.

Legacy
After his death in 1978, a Metro station was renamed in his honor. Rue de l'Aqueduc, north of rue Saint-Jacques, became rue Lucien-L'Allier in 1979. In 2001, the Réseau de transport métropolitain railway Lucien-L'Allier station adjacent to the Metro station was also renamed.

References
http://www.stm.info/metro/m16.htm

1909 births
1978 deaths
Canadian electrical engineers
Montreal Metro
People from Saint-Laurent, Quebec
McGill University Faculty of Engineering alumni